The Blackburn Hawks (formerly known as the Blackhawks and the Lancashire Hawks) are a British ice hockey team based in Blackburn, Lancashire. They are currently members of the EIHA Moralee Conference (NIHL N1), and have previously played in the British National League and the English League Premier Division. Their home ice is the 3,200 seat Blackburn Arena.

History

The Blackhawks era 
On October 28, 1990 the Blackhawks played their first game, in which the Blackhawks defeated the Oxford City Stars 6–3. The game was played as a non-import challenge match, where no professional players born outside of the United Kingdom were iced. During the 1990–91 season that followed, all Blackhawks games were away games, since the newly built Blackburn Arena had not yet been completed. The first home game was played on January 26 1991 and coincidentally also resulted in a 6–3 victory against Oxford. The first goal scored at the arena was by the Blackhawks' Dan Holden, an offensive defenceman who accrued a total of 116 points over the course of the season. The Blackhawks highest points scorer in 1990–91 was Fred Perlini, who contributed 132 points (83 goals and 49 assists) in just 21 games. Other notable players were Gary Shearman, Trevor Foster, Georgie Powell, and Paul Fleury. Under manager Keith Purvis and coach Pete Murray, the Blackhawks finished fourth place in the English League Division One. After the collapse of Solihull, the Blackhawks were also promoted to the Heineken League.

During the 1991–92 season, ex-Toronto Maple Leafs coach Doug McKay took over the running of the team. However, his tenure was short-lived due to financial problems, and soon the Blackhawks were left without a manager. By the end of the season, the Blackhawks were relegated back into the English League Division One.

Building to league success 
In 1992–93, the team began to rebuild under the new name of the Blackburn Hawks. Canadian Glenn Knight took up the reins as player-coach, but soon passed the responsibility to the new addition to the team, ex-AHL forward Steve Moria. The team's financial situation was improved following a buy out by Peel Holdings, the firm owning the site on which Blackburn Arena is situated. This change in financial status allowed for an influx of new imports.

The Hawks defeated the Milton Keynes Kings early in the season and competed well throughout, narrowly missing out on a playoff spot. The season was dubbed a "tremendous season and certainly one that the Hawks's faithful should remember for a long time to come."  

Prior to the start of the 1994–95 season, the Hawks were again left in turmoil due to the sudden departure of Steve Moria for the Swindon Wildcats. Inexperienced forward Mark Stokes volunteered himself for the role of player-coach. This season was the year of the Hawks' most disastrous B&H Cup campaign, with six successive defeats. However, the Hawks headlined for other reasons.

The British Ice Hockey Association imposed bans on the new imports Sverre Sears, Matt Zilinskas, and Jeff Winstanley after they appeared on the front page of the Lancashire Evening Telegraph following a late night naked skating session. This led to their dismissal from the club, and prompted a shakeup in staffing. Ex-Toronto Maple Leaf Rocky Saganiuk arrived, promising the fans a spot in the playoffs. Sangiuk brought in Trent Casey, Darren Durdle, and Tony Cimellaro, but the Hawks' leaky defence contributed to their relegation to Division Two come the end of the season. However, a last minute re-structure of the league meant that the team began the new season back in division one.

Before the 1995–96 campaign began, it became apparent that Saganiuk was not to return, electing to stay in Canada. Under the management of Mike Cockayne, the Hawks secured sponsorship with Thwaites Beer, and began the season sporting new look red, black, and yellow uniforms.

For the first time, the Hawks took top place in the league, with the most important result being a 12–9 victory over the newly formed Manchester Storm. The match was played at the Nynex Arena in front of a then record-breaking crowd of 9,500, and watched by millions on Sky TV, in what was the first live UK hockey match to be shown on satellite television in the UK. Later in the season the Hawks again visited the Nynex Arena in a league title decider that generated another British attendance record of 16,280.

The Northern Premier League 
The 1996–97 season gave the Hawks yet another new coach in Jim Pennycook, one of the most experienced players in the British game. The season saw the start of the well-televised Ice Hockey Superleague, which ultimately split British ice hockey teams according to their financial position. Blackburn were not part of this new wave, and instead competed in the Northern Premier League of the BNL, which was limited to three imports.

The Hawks' difficulties began right at the start of the season, losing two of their three imports before the end of November. Pennycook played most of the season through injury and suffered from a very depleted roster after Christmas with only eight players available for some games. They quickly made a couple of new signings before the transfer deadline, and finish the season in a mid-table position.

For the 1997–98 season, another name change was brought in, with the intention of promoting the team across the County; thus the Lancashire Hawks were born. However, attendances failed to improve, and many fans expressed disapproval of the new name.

A number of staffing issues, injuries, and roster changes saw the Hawks finish bottom of the league and last in the play-offs.

The Bobby Haig era 
At the start of the 1998–99 season, the team found themselves competing in yet another new league, the English League Premier Division. This was a league set up for teams that wanted to compete effectively, but on a smaller budget than those in the British National League. The Hawks competed against teams such as Solihull, Swindon and Milton Keynes, and reverted to the previous name, the Blackburn Hawks, thanks to the pressure put on the management team at the Supporters Club annual general meeting that took place in the Arena bar in May 1998.

Jim Pennycook was invited back to the Arena in a playing capacity but Arena management were to look elsewhere for a coach this season. An experienced Scotsman came to the helm; brother of former Hawk John, Bobby Haig, was the man charged with bringing back the teams' former glory.

The season started with a convincing win over the Wightlink Raiders, with a 13–1 scoreline. A successful 1998 was followed by controversy at the beginning of 1999, when it emerged that the team had spent three times their seasons budget by Christmas. Five players were released from their contracts at this point to try to ease the financial burden on the club, including import Chad Brandimore and club captain Simon Mills. By mid March the team were floundering in the league, and it became clear that the team would not be taking part in the end of season play-offs due to their financial problems. However, this did not deter the fans, as almost 1,500 watched a 10–9 victory over Chelmsford and a close 7–6 defeat to the hands of Milton Keynes at the close of the league campaign. The victory over Chelmsford meant that this season's team had won more home games than any previous year since the team's formation in 1991.

With the financial problems at the end of the season came the obvious worries and rumours over the club's future. Some feared that Blackburn would not host competitive ice hockey team in 1999–2000 campaign, and sections of the press were reporting that the team had been threatened with expulsion from the league for refusing to take part in the playoffs.

It was decided to drop into English League Division One again, a decision which prompted a mixed reaction from fans, largely due to the lack of skilled import players in the league. To boost the number of games that the team played, they also signed up for the Border League, consisting of teams from Scotland and northern England. Under the leadership of Haig, the Hawks just missed out on a play-off place at the end of the season.

The 2000–1 saw the Hawks still guided by Bobby Haig, and playing in the English National Ice Hockey League (the new name for ED1). The season started with many ups and downs, ranging from 14–1 defeat at the hands of the Kingston Jets, to a 14–0 victory over the Bradford Bulldogs, and all before Christmas. In this time the team also retained the North West Cup at the expense of the Altrincham Aces. However, on January 27, 2001, the Aces gained their revenge, knocking Blackburn out of the English Cup. The team ultimately finished fourth in the league.

On April 3, 2001, the Blackburn Hawks celebrated their 10th anniversary with the return of Steve Moria and many former players. The game, where Bobby Haig's All Stars played Steve Moria's Select, ended 8–9 in favour of Moria's squad. The match, which attracted a crowd of over 1,000, raised £4,000 for the NSPCC.

The 2001–02 season was far from successful for the Hawks, who ultimately finished fourth in the ENIHL North Division. The team also lost all six games played in the ENIHL Cup, and did not make it past group stages in English cup. This season set precedent for the Hawks, and subsequent seasons seem to follow a pattern; a place in the league's top five, a reasonable performance in the cup, and Bobby Haig as the team's top scorer.

In 2002–3 it was fifth in league, and just missing out on the final of the English National Premier Cup by placing second in qualifying table. This close brush with cup success was not matched in the Northern Cup, where the Hawks' did not with a single game.

After a no point weekend mid-season, it seemed that Haig attributed the team's lack of success to an absence of young blood on the team, saying "We had no Under 19s and we also found it difficult to raise our game after the disappointment of (an 8–2 defeat at) Sheffield. Perhaps we need an injection of some new players. It's been a bad weekend and I have got some serious thinking to do."

One of Haig's new young player's was 19-year-old Richard Hulme, who debuted in a challenge match against Spartak Durham. Hulme, a product of the Hawks youth teams, was to be involved in a controversial incident.

In October 2003, minutes from the end of an under 19 game against the Altrincham Tigers, Hulme was attacked and injured by Tigers' player Robert Brownbill. Hulme lost two teeth and received a broken jaw when hit with Brownbills steel fist during the game. In January 2003 Brownbill appeared before Preston Crown Court, charged with assaulting Richard Hulme causing actual bodily harm. In what was the first case of its kind in the country, Brownbill was initially remanded on bail on what was to become a test case for the sport. Brownbill was eventually fined £250.

As predicted, by the end of the season, Bobby Haig was the team's top scorer (fourth in the league) with 56 points in just 18 games. (The three scorers above Haig were all from league winners Altrincham).

A new look and a new start 

The 2003–04 season had a positive start; a new logo, a new strip, a renewed sponsorship contract with Thwaites Brewery, and a clutch of upcoming young players left Haig and new team captain Neil Haworth in high spirits before the first game. The team's preparations paid off; the first weekend of the season consisted of a 13-2 win over the Bradford Bulldogs, and another 20-3 victory against the Grimsby Buffaloes.

However, this success wasn't to continue through the season. The Hawks attained a fourth position in the league, lost every game in the Premier Cup, and finished second in playoffs table, missing out on the final. Despite all of this, Bobby Haig continued to flourish at Blackburn, and posted another great season with 52 points in 18 games (fifth points scorer in the league).

The following season, despite initial optimism, held much of the same for the Hawks. A series of poor results led to pressure being placed on player/coach Haig, and the Scot contemplated taking his experience elsewhere. However, after talks with the Arena management and club owners, Haig settled on staying at the expense of his job as duty manager and as the junior ice hockey development director, in order to concentrate fully on the coaching of the senior team.

By mid-November, the team had no chance to progress in the Premier Cup, but had more success in the league, sitting comfortable at the top of the North division. Their championship hopes were boosted when a 4–2 loss against the Swindon Wildcats was recorded as a 5-0 victory by the EIHA after Swindon fielded an ineligible player. 

The team finished third in ENIHL, which did not allow them to progress through to the playoff group stages. The Hawks also lost every game in ENIHL cup.

2005–06 held similar successes; a third place in the ENHL which, due to an altering of the playoff format, led them to the group stages. However, despite placing second in the playoff group stages table, the Hawks did not make it to the final. Other cup competitions had mixed successes; the team made the semi-final of ENIHL Cup (where they lost 7-5 to Cardiff), yet finished bottom of group C in the Premier Cup.

The following season heralded a change in the Hawks usual pattern; they finished fifth in ENIHL (missing out on playoffs), fifth in Northern League, and missed out on the playoffs in ENIHL cup on goal difference. However, for the first season in a while, the team's top scorer was not Bobby Haig, but David Meikle, with 35 points in 16 games.

Decline and relegation 
The start of the 2007 season saw the departure of legend Bobby Haig to his former club, the Braehead Pirates. Coaching duties were taken over by Ian Hough and John Dunford.

In a mixed season, the club had no success in the ENIHL cup, and finished the season bottom of Northern League and sixth in ENIHL North. Despite this, some good performances were given by the team; the superb combination of Rick Bentham and David Meikle score 48 and 46 points, respectively. The goaltenders also had a good season; in 21 games Daniel Brittle posted a 90.03% save percentage, while Ian Thirkettle attained 89.08% in 18 games.

Following the addition of three teams to the ENIHL in 2008–09, the league was restructured. It was given a four-division structure; North 1 and 2, South 1 and 2, with promotion and relegation between the two sides. The Hawks competed in the North 1 division and did not compete in the Northern League this season. Under coach Neil Abel, the Hawks finished next from last in ENIHL North 1, and were involved in a relegation series against fellow local side Manchester Phoenix ENL. After a close run first leg at the Blackburn Arena, the Hawks lost 8–7, making it 10–9 on aggregate. Following this defeat, the team would originally have played in ENL North 2 for the 2009/10 season; however, Billingham Bombers dropped out of the league, saving Blackburn from relegation.

Rebuilding 
Saved from relegation due to league restructuring, the Hawks began to rise from the bottom of the league to challenge the other end of the table.  A fifth-place finish the following season was then bettered by a 4th-place position and with it a place in the postseason. Qualifying for the end of season playoffs after a three-year absence, the Hawks were narrowly eliminated by Whitley Bay in the semi-final, despite beating the undefeated regular season champions 4-2 in a thrilling first leg at Blackburn Arena. Making the arena a difficult venue for postseason opposition was to become a major attribute for future success.

Expected to challenge for the title the next year, the now traditional slow start to the season had left Blackburn off the pace, behind the previous years champions Whitley Warriors and the runaway leaders Billingham Stars. However boosted by the signing of Finnish import Sami Narkia, the Hawks finished with an impressive run of results, and although the gap at the top of the league would prove just out of reach, there was a real belief that the squad was now capable of winning the playoffs.

The semi final once again saw the Hawks defeat Whitley Warriors 4-2 at home, however this time they were able to finish off the job away from home in the second leg and book a place in the final. 
The Billingham Stars were the opposition in the final, and the home leg of the final saw 1,300 fans flock to the Blackburn Arena and create an atmosphere not seen for many a year. They were rewarded with a 2-1 win for the Hawks, although the two sides were so evenly matched that victory in the second leg would not be a formality. A controversial decision to dismiss netminder Daniel Brittle in the early stages of the second leg would prove to assist Billingham in overturning the aggregate score, a 7-5 result in favour of the league champions clinched the double for the Stars and left Blackburn reflecting on a missed opportunity to finally end the clubs 22-year wait for silverware.

Playoff champions and league challengers 
A disappointing end to the season made way for a troubled summer with restructuring on and off the ice. A number of what were considered 'key players' made moves to local rivals including the newly reformed Deeside Dragons and Altrincham based Trafford Metros. Fans and local commentators alike bemoaned a 'missed opportunity' to capitalise on one of the most successful campaigns in recent memory and the Hawks were widely tipped for relegation.

However, a quiet rebuild - with a particular emphasis on talented young players keen to impress - was underway and an unseasoned side, bolstered by former EPL forward Dan MacKriel, new Latvian import Ivo Dimitrievs and later the returning Aaron Davies began a spirited challenge for a trophy.

Blackburn would once again qualify for the playoffs and faced a two-legged semi-final with runaway league winners the Solway Sharks, a side defeated just once in the 2012/13 season. Again widely written off, the Hawks held the Sharks to a respectable 5-3 win in Dumfries before a stunning 6-1 victory at Blackburn Arena set up a second consecutive Blackburn-Billingham final.

For a second year fans filled 'The Nest' and created an electric atmosphere as Aaron Davies, Sam Dunford and Myles Dacres secured a 3-2 victory for the Hawks and a one-goal lead to take to the North East.

With a sizable and noisy travelling support the Hawks exorcised the demons of the previous year, outplaying and outscoring the Stars 6-3 to win their first silverware in the team's 23-year history.

2013/14 was started with four straight wins before a slump saw the team fall quickly down the table and seemingly out of the title race with less than half of the season gone. New signings in the former of Manchester Minotaurs' captain Jake Nurse and Canadian import Jon Adams, ignited the season and a run of nine straight wins propelled the club back up the table, and from December the club would only lose twice in all competitions, both to League Champions Solway Sharks.

The Hawks reached the Playoffs again after finishing 2nd in the League, equalling their highest ever finish, and after a tense semi-final against Billingham, the Hawks went through to face Solway in the final, although the Scots showed their class by completely a League, Cup and Playoffs hat trick with a 2-0 victory.

The 2014/15 season will undoubtedly go down as one of the memorable in the clubs 25-year history.  Under the stewardship of Jared Owen, the Hawks achieved their first league title, clinching the Moralee Conference with 6 games to spare.  Not only were they crowned champions but they also went through the whole league season unbeaten.  Giving them the tag of 'invincibles'.  Blackburn also exorcised the ghost of the previous season by winning the playoffs, defeating Billingham Stars 6-3 in the final after overcoming Sheffield Spartans 4-2 in the semi final.

The club also dominated the end of season awards with captain Chris Arnone winning the fans favourite, Adam Brittle being voted as league player of the season and Jared Owen coach of the year. The club were also benefitting off the ice with attendances topping 1.000 on some occasions, sparking memories of the halcyon days of the early to mid nineties.  Over 700 Blackburn fans also attended the play off weekend in Solway.

The double double, a new low point, and rebuilding again 

Following the success of the unbeaten 2014/15, Jared Owen left the club, leaving Daniel MacKriel as player/coach as the club aimed to cement their new found place at the top of the NIHL pyramid and did by again winning the double for the second year in a row, securing the title with a win over Solway Sharks and a strong Playoff Final win over Solihull Barons. One particular highlight from that season was forward RJay Berra joining Elite League side, Edinburgh Capitals, midway through the season.

Berra had played 27 games for the club at that point, amassing an impressive 71 points, only outscored in the end by Adam Brittle (84 points) and Richard Bentham (84).

Several key players left the team during the post-season, including all three Brittle brothers, captain Chris Arnone, and a variety of others. The change in personnel, combined with several Premier League teams coming into the NIHL, saw the team struggle in the subsequent season, albeit a late season surge confirmed the team's place in the NIHL Moralee division for another year. To sum up the decline in the club's fortunes following on from the player exodus, Bentham only secured 47 points, 37 fewer than the previous year. His points tally would further decline the next year, securing just 45, yet still finishing as the team's highest points scorer. 

The next few seasons were much the same, with the Hawks being competitive against similar skilled teams, but struggling badly against the former Premier League teams. Czech forward Petr Valusiak completed the season with a respectable 57 points, the highest of any Hawks player since the 2015/16 season.

Blackburn started the 2019/20 season with a 7-3 away win at Nottingham Lions, but it was another long, hard season for the Hawks, winning just 7 of the 24 league games. This was contrasted by 16 defeats, and a further overtime defeat. Overall, the Hawks secured just 15 points, the lowest total since the 1997/8 season. The Hawks finished 6th (out of 7), only bettering the Nottingham Lions, who had lost all 24 matches.

Following the end of that season, it was announced that the Hawks had asked to be demoted to the Laidler division as the club couldn't financially sustain life in the Moralee division. This was met negatively by the fans, as well as surprise from divisional rivals. 

Due to Covid-19, these plans were put on hold due to the 2020/21 season being cancelled, and it was eventually reversed when the ownership of the club changed, with new co-owner Graham Lomax confirming that the club would be remaining in the Moralee.

in 2021, Blackburn Hawks competed in a mini-tournament with Widnes Wild, Sheffield Scimitars and Nottingham Lions. Despite being heavily beaten by Widnes in the first game, losing 9-3, the Hawks won the next four, scoring 22 goals in the process. Despite this, a defeat to Widnes in the final game meant the Hawks missed out on winning the tournament. Upon the resumption of the league following COVID, the Hawks finished the 2021/2022 season in a disappointing 7th, but avoided a relegation Playoff due to the promotion/relegation system being suspended.

Club roster 2022-23
(*) Denotes a Non-British Trained player (Import)

2021/22 Outgoing

Colours and origin 
The club's colours were initially similar to the red, white, and black of the Chicago Blackhawks, due to the similarities in name. However, upon his arrival in 1992, Steve Moria changed the colours to teal, grey, black, and white, a similar scheme to that of the San Jose Sharks. This change coincided with the change in name. In 1994, following the departure of Moria, the club adopted a red, white, and gold scheme which can still be seen today. The current Hawks logo was designed during the Bobby Haigh era by Pete Sheffield.

The arena and fan base 
Blackburn Arena supports 3,200 spectators seated at each side of the ice, with standing room on the balcony behind the goal. The rink is measured as 60m x 30m (197 ft x 98 ft).

Home matches attract an average of around 700-800 fans.

The team is supported by the Blackburn Hawks Supporters Club which has been formed by the joining of the Mohawks, a tribute to legendary player Steve Moria, which organises regular events for fans, and HawksF5.  The HawksF5 came into being as an independent way to channel the passion and dedication of the fans, and this has spawned various new forms of media, such as the internet radio coverage provided by members, as well as player interviews and podcasts.

Rivalries 
The club's biggest rivalry was formerly with the Trafford Metros, now Manchester Minotaurs, due to the proximity of Blackburn Arena and the old Altrincham Ice Rink in Broadheath, Greater Manchester. Many of the original Hawks came from Altrincham, which resulted in a fierce rivalry both on and off the ice.

More recent ongoing feuds have been with Whitley Warriors and the Billingham Stars, the latter of which have faced the Hawks in three Playoff finals in four years between 2011 and 2015, the only exception being 2014.

Season-by-season record 
''Note: GP = Games played, W = Wins, L = Losses, T = Ties, Pts = Points, GF = Goals for, GA = Goals against.

Honoured members 

 1994/95, Darren Durdle, Paul Hannant British League Division One Allstar
 1995/96, Steve Chartrand, British League Division One Allstar
 1995/96, Ryan Kummu, British League Division One Allstar
 Ollie Lomax, Play Off Champion 2012-2013, 2014-2015 & 2015-2016, League Champion 2014-2015 & 2015-2016. Blackburn Hawks all-time longest serving player

Head coaches
 1990–91 Pete Murray
 1991–92 Doug McKay
 1992–94 Steve Moria
 1994–95 Mark Stokes & Rocky Saganiuk
 1995–96 Ryan Kummu
 1996–98 Jim Pennycook
 1998–07 Bobby Haig
 2007–08 Ian McDade (Hough) & John Dunford
 2008–09 Neil Abel & Les Millie
 2009–15 Jared Owen
 2015-16 Daniel MacKriel 
 2016-16 Matt Darlow
 2016-18 Steven Duncombe
 2018-19 James Neil

Team Captains
 1993–94 Simon Ferry
 1995–96 John Haig
 1996–97 Neil Abel
 1997–98 Neil Abel & Simon Mills
 1998–99 Simon Mills
 2002–03 Gordon Whyte
 2004–06 Neal Haworth
 2006–08 Michael Brunton
 2011–16 Chris Arnone
 2016-18 Ollie Lomax
 2018-19 Luke Boothroyd
 2019-20 James Royds

External links
Blackburn Hawks official website

References 

Sport in Blackburn
Ice hockey teams in England